Angus James Cooper (born 7 May 1964) is a retired male hammer thrower from New Zealand. At the 1990 Commonwealth Games in Auckland he won a bronze medal in the men's hammer throw with a throw of 71.26m. He is the New Zealand national record holder with 73.10m but his best distance was 73.96m which was not ratified as a record for unknown reasons.

In 1990, Cooper was awarded the New Zealand 1990 Commemoration Medal.

Achievements

References

1964 births
Living people
New Zealand male hammer throwers
Commonwealth Games bronze medallists for New Zealand
Athletes (track and field) at the 1990 Commonwealth Games
Athletes (track and field) at the 1994 Commonwealth Games
Commonwealth Games medallists in athletics
20th-century New Zealand people
21st-century New Zealand people
Medallists at the 1990 Commonwealth Games